The Reykjavík Grapevine is an English language Icelandic magazine and online newspaper based in the Icelandic capital of Reykjavík. Its target audience primarily consists of foreigners, immigrants, international students, young Icelanders, and tourists. The magazine is currently a year-round publication, fortnightly from May to October, and monthly from November to April.

The magazine debuted on June 13, 2003. Its first six issues were edited by Jón Trausti Sigurðarson and Valur Gunnarsson. In its second year,  the magazine grew in circulation from 25,000 issues to 30,101. In its third year, American-born Bart Cameron took over as editor, also editing Inside Reykjavík, the Grapevine Guide, in 2006, through the Mál og Menning imprint of Edda Press.

Bart was followed over the next decade by editors Sveinn Birkir Björnsson, Haukur S. Magnússon, Anna Andersen, Helga Þórey Jónsdóttir, Sveinbjörn Pálsson again, Jón Trausti Sigurðarson. and Valur Grettisson. The current Editor-in-Chief is Canadian-born Catharene Fulton. 

During the Iceland Airwaves music festival, The Reykjavík Grapevine became a daily publication focusing on music for some years. From 2016 to 2019, The Reykjavík Grapevine published a special magazine to celebrate the Iceland Airwaves festival, and started a quarterly city-guide sister-publication entitled Best of Reykjavík. A thrice-annually Best of Iceland magazine followed. The magazine's relative longevity has put it in a unique position as an English language publication about Iceland, and has sometimes made it a popular point of reference in international news and media. In a similar vein, in 2016, the magazine's Twitter coverage of the Euro 2016 football tournament became popular internationally.

References

2003 establishments in Iceland
Cultural magazines
English-language newspapers published in Europe
Magazines published in Iceland
Magazines established in 2003
Mass media in Reykjavík
Monthly magazines
Social liberalism